Mohammad Faheem Irfan is an Indian politician and member of Samajwadi Party. He represented the Bilari constituency of Uttar Pradesh.  He is member of 17th Uttar Pradesh Assembly. Previously, he was member of 16th Uttar Pradesh Assembly.

His father, Mohammad Irfan, was also politician.

References 

Year of birth missing (living people)
Living people
Members of the Uttar Pradesh Legislative Assembly
Samajwadi Party politicians
Samajwadi Party politicians from Uttar Pradesh